Seneca River Crossing Canals Historic District is a national historic district located at Montezuma and Tyre in Cayuga and Seneca Counties, New York.  The district includes more than a mile of the Enlarged Erie Canal prism (built here between 1849 and 1857); towpath and heelpath; a drydock; the remains of the Richmond (Montezuma) Aqueduct crossing the Seneca River; remnants of the original Erie Canal, built between 1817 and 1825 and including Lock #62 and piers of the original mule bridge from that era; and a culvert that carries a stream beneath the Enlarged Erie Canal.

It was listed on the National Register of Historic Places in 2005.

References

Historic districts on the National Register of Historic Places in New York (state)
Historic districts in Cayuga County, New York
Erie Canal parks, trails, and historic sites
National Register of Historic Places in Cayuga County, New York
Canals on the National Register of Historic Places in New York (state)
National Register of Historic Places in Seneca County, New York
Historic districts in Seneca County, New York